Grand Rounds may refer to:

 Grand rounds, a methodology of medical education
 Grand Rounds (journal), a case report journal
 Grand Rounds, Inc., a health care company based in San Francisco, California, United States
 Grand Rounds National Scenic Byway, a parkway system in Minneapolis, Minnesota, United States

See also 
 Grand Ronde (disambiguation)